Kamno may refer to:
Kamno, Slovenia, a village in Slovenia
Kamno, Russia, a rural locality (a village) in Pskovsky District of Pskov Oblast, Russia